Now's the Time may refer to:

 "Now's the Time" (composition), by Charlie Parker
 Now's the Time (Sonny Rollins album), 1964 - featuring the above 
 Now's the Time (Shirley Scott album), 1967 - featuring the above 
 Now's the Time (New York Unit album), 1992
 Now's the Time (4 P.M. album), 1995
 Now's the Time (Billy Mitchell album), 1976
 Now's the Time (Houston Person and Ron Carter album), a1990
 Now's the Time!, a 2011 album by Tony Christie
 Now's the Time (Francissca Peter album), a 1989 album by Francissca Peter
 Now's the Time (film), a 1932 film starring Harry Barris

See also 
 Now Is the Time (disambiguation)